Ramona High School (RHS) is located in Ramona, California. Ramona High is a member of the Ramona City Unified School District and serves the communities of Ramona, San Diego Country Estates, and citizens of the surrounding rural area as well as small numbers of people from Santa Ysabel and Julian.

History
Throughout most of the 1800s Ramona consisted of many one room schools that served students of many different ages. As the population of Ramona began to rapidly grow in the late nineteenth century, the need for a high school arose. Ramona High School was first established in 1894 holding classes in the attic of the Ramona Town Hall. The conditions of this location proved to be far too uncomfortable which led to a bell tower like building being constructed on 9th and D Street which would serve as the Ramona High School Campus from 1898-1911. In 1912 another building was constructed on 9th street adjacent to the football field, this building would hold Ramona High School classes from 1912-1936. From 1936-1969 Ramona High School classes were held in a larger building also facing ninth street, this building currently serves as the John H. Wilson Administrative center. From 1969 to present, classes have been held on the much larger Ramona High School campus on Hanson Lane Road.

Demographics
The school is composed of around 2,000 students, with a demographic breakdown of about 52% Hispanic, 43% Caucasian, 4% African American, and about 1% of other races

Athletics
The school boasts a successful Varsity sports program which includes: Football, Boys' Water Polo, Girls' Volleyball, Cross Country, Girls' Golf, Girls' Tennis, Girls'Basketball, Girls' Basketball, Wrestling, Boys' Soccer, Girls' Soccer, Girls' Water Polo, Track & Field, Swim & Dive, Cheer & Song, Boys' Volleyball, Boys' Golf, Boys' Tennis, Baseball, Girls' Lacrosse, and Softball. RHS also has a Choir, Marching band, and Navy JROTC program.

On November 3, 2017, the varsity football team went 10-0 in season play.

The school once had a prominent basketball program. John H. Wilson coached the boys basketball team from 1917-1934. Barely being able to field even 5 players, Wilson turned Ramona into one of the better programs in the league. Competing (And often winning against) much larger high schools such as Escondido, Fallbrook, San Diego and Coronado.

Academics
The school offers a number of AP Courses including AP Calculus, AP English, AP US History, AP European History, AP Chemistry, AP Biology, AP Environmental Science, AP Spanish Language, AP Statistics, AP Art History and AP Economics.
According to the LA Times, the average SAT score at Ramona High School was 1551 out of a possible 2400 for the 2011-2012 academic school year.
The Class of 2014 saw 26 students admitted to a University of California Campus, 15 enrolled. Ramona High School also offers automotive and welding classes.

Notable alumni
Nick Vincent, MLB Pitcher for the Miami Marlins 
Travis Knight (basketball), Center for the University of Connecticut and the Boston Celtics
Cole Sulser, MLB pitcher
Beau Sulser, MLB pitcher

References

External links
 Ramona High School Web Site
 Ramona High School Athletics (MaxPreps.com)

High schools in San Diego County, California
Public high schools in California
Ramona, San Diego County, California
1894 establishments in California